is a prefectural art museum in Japan

Collection
Tokushima Modern Art Museum permanent collection includes works by Western and Japanese artists, like Picasso, Klee, Kiyokata Kaburagi, Seishi Kishimoto, Antony Gormley.

Notable exhibitions
In 2015 Tokushima Modern Art Museum exhibited western works from Tokyo Fuji Art Museum collection, summarizing 300 years of western art, starting from baroque paintings by Anthony van Dyck, including work by Jean-Baptiste Camille Corot,  Pierre-Auguste Renoir, Claude Monet and up to modern works by Moise Kisling. Japanese artist Yutaka Moriguchi had solo exhibition in the museum in 2011. In 2008 the museum held International Print exhibition, which included works by James Turrell.

Notes and references

External links
Tokushima Modern Art Museum

Museums in Tokushima Prefecture
Art museums and galleries in Japan
Modern art museums in Japan
Tokushima (city)